Football Club Tighina is a Moldovan football club based in Bender (also known as Tighina), Moldova.

History

During its existence, the club has been known by the following names:

 1950—1958: Burevestnik Bender
 In 1959: Lokomotiv Bender
 1960—1969: Nistrul Bender
 1970—1987: Pishchevik Bender / Kharchovyk Bendery
 In 1988: Tighina Bender
 In 1989: Tighina-RShVSM
 In 1990: Tighina Bender
 In 1991: Tighina-Apoel Bender
 1992—1996: Tighina Bender
 1996—1999: Dinamo Bender
 1999—2000: Dinamo-Stimold Tighina
 2000—2011: Dinamo Bender
 2011—2014: Tighina
 2014—2017: Dinamo Bender
 Since 2017: Tighina

League and Cup history

Soviet Union
{|class="wikitable"
|-bgcolor="#efefef"
! Season
! Div.
! Pos.
! Pl.
! W
! D
! L
! GS
! GA
! P
!Soviet Cup
!Top Scorer (League)
!Head Coach
|-
|align=center|1974
|align=center|3rd
|align=center|20
|align=center|38
|align=center|5
|align=center|6
|align=center|27
|align=center|14
|align=center|73
|align=center|16
|align=center|
|align=left|
|align=left|
|}

Moldova
{|class="wikitable"
|-bgcolor="#efefef"
! Season
! Div.
! Pos.
! Pl.
! W
! D
! L
! GS
! GA
! P
!Cup
!Top Scorer (League)
!Head Coach
|-
|align=center|1992
|align=center rowspan=7|1st
|align=center|4
|align=center|22
|align=center|9
|align=center|8
|align=center|5
|align=center|21
|align=center|17
|align=center|26
|align=center|Quarterfinals
|align=left|
|align=left| Eugen Piunovschi
|-
|align=center|1992–93
|align=center|11
|align=center|30
|align=center|8
|align=center|8
|align=center|14
|align=center|32
|align=center|46
|align=center|22
|align=center|Round of 8
|align=left|
|align=left| Eugen Piunovschi
|-
|align=center|1993–94
|align=center|11
|align=center|30
|align=center|9
|align=center|8
|align=center|13
|align=center|43
|align=center|55
|align=center|26
|align=center|Round of 8
|align=left|
|align=left| Nicolae Mandricenco (2nd round)
|-
|align=center|1994–95
|align=center|4
|align=center|36
|align=center|18
|align=center|2
|align=center|6
|align=center|43
|align=center|18
|align=center|56
|align=center|Round of 8
|align=left|
|align=left| Dumitru Chihaev
|-
|align=center|1995–96
|align=center|12
|align=center|30
|align=center|7
|align=center|5
|align=center|18
|align=center|41
|align=center|52
|align=center|26
|align=center|Quarterfinals
|align=left|
|align=left|
|-
|align=center|1996–97
|align=center|7
|align=center|30
|align=center|12
|align=center|5
|align=center|13
|align=center|42
|align=center|45
|align=center|41
|align=center|Round of 8
|align=left|
|align=left|
|-
|align=center|1997–98
|align=center bgcolor=#f65f45|12
|align=center|26
|align=center|6
|align=center|4
|align=center|16
|align=center|19
|align=center|47
|align=center|22
|align=center|?
|align=left|
|align=left|
|-
|align=center|1998–99
|align=center rowspan=2|2nd
|align=center|16
|align=center|30
|align=center|1
|align=center|3
|align=center|26
|align=center|12
|align=center|40
|align=center|6
|align=center|?
|align=left|
|align=left|
|-
|align=center|1999-2000
|align=center bgcolor=#f65f45|8
|align=center|26
|align=center|10
|align=center|3
|align=center|13
|align=center|27
|align=center|36
|align=center|33
|align=center|?
|align=left|
|align=left| Victor Murahovschi
|-
|align=center|2000–01
|align=center|3rd
|align=center bgcolor=lightgreen|1
|align=center|16
|align=center|12
|align=center|4
|align=center|0
|align=center|43
|align=center|9
|align=center|40
|align=center|?
|align=left|
|align=left|
|-
|align=center|2001–02
|align=center rowspan = 4|2nd
|align=center|12
|align=center|30
|align=center|9
|align=center|5
|align=center|16
|align=center|30
|align=center|46
|align=center|32
|align=center|Round of 8
|align=left|
|align=left|
|-
|align=center|2002–03
|align=center|8
|align=center|26
|align=center|9
|align=center|7
|align=center|10
|align=center|27
|align=center|22
|align=center|34
|align=center|?
|align=left|
|align=left|
|-
|align=center|2003–04
|align=center|5
|align=center|30
|align=center|15
|align=center|7
|align=center|8
|align=center|50
|align=center|24
|align=center|52
|align=center|Quarterfinals
|align=left|
|align=left|
|-
|align=center|2004–05
|align=center bgcolor=lightgreen|1
|align=center|30
|align=center|24
|align=center|3
|align=center|3
|align=center|68
|align=center|16
|align=center|75
|align=center|Round of 8
|align=left|
|align=left|
|-
|align=center|2005–06
|align=center rowspan=6|1st
|align=center|8
|align=center|28
|align=center|2
|align=center|9
|align=center|17
|align=center|17
|align=center|59
|align=center|15
|align=center|?
|align=left|
|align=left|
|-
|align=center|2006–07
|align=center|10
|align=center|36
|align=center|3
|align=center|13
|align=center|20
|align=center|24
|align=center|72
|align=center|22
|align=center|Quarterfinals
|align=left|
|align=left|
|-
|align=center|2007–08
|align=center|9
|align=center|30
|align=center|7
|align=center|5
|align=center|18
|align=center|30
|align=center|57
|align=center|26
|align=center|Round of 8
|align=left|
|align=left| Iuri Hodîchin
|-
|align=center|2008–09
|align=center|5
|align=center|30
|align=center|11
|align=center|9
|align=center|10
|align=center|42
|align=center|45
|align=center|42
|align=center|Round of 8
|align=left|
|align=left| Iuri Hodîchin
|-
|align=center|2009–10
|align=center|10
|align=center|33
|align=center|9
|align=center|5
|align=center|19
|align=center|36
|align=center|66
|align=center|32
|align=center|Quarterfinals
|align=left| Alexandru Pașcenco – 5
|align=left| Iuri Hodîchin
|-
|align=center|2010–11
|align=center bgcolor=#f65f45|14
|align=center|39
|align=center|6
|align=center|4
|align=center|29
|align=center|25
|align=center|118
|align=center|22
|align=center|2nd Round
|align=left| Sergiu Zacon – 6
|align=left| Iuri Hodîchin
|-
|align=center|2011–12
|align=center rowspan=2|2nd
|align=center|12
|align=center|30
|align=center|10
|align=center|5
|align=center|15
|align=center|43
|align=center|53
|align=center|35
|align=center|Round of 8
|align=left|
|align=left| Iuri Hodîchin
|-
|align=center|2012–13
|align=center bgcolor=#f65f45|13
|align=center|28
|align=center|6
|align=center|2
|align=center|20
|align=center|35
|align=center|90
|align=center|20
|align=center|1st round
|align=left|
|align=left| Iuri Hodîchin
|-
|align=center|2013–14
|align=center rowspan=1|3rd
|align=center bgcolor=#DDDDDD|10
|align=center|0
|align=center|0
|align=center|0
|align=center|0
|align=center|0
|align=center|0
|align=center|0
|align=center|1st round
|align=left|
|align=left|
|-
|2014–15
|rowspan=3 colspan=12|Tighina played in regional amateur leagues.
|-
|2015–16
|-
|2016–17
|-
|align=center|2017
|align=center rowspan=2|3rd
|align=center|2
|align=center|18
|align=center|15
|align=center|2
|align=center|1
|align=center|59
|align=center|13
|align=center|47
|align=center|1st round
|align=left|
|align=left|
|-
|align=center|2018
|align=center bgcolor=lightgreen|1
|align=center|18
|align=center|14
|align=center|3
|align=center|1
|align=center|80
|align=center|11
|align=center|45
|align=center|2nd round
|align=left|
|align=left|
|-
|align=center|2019
|align=center rowspan=2|2nd
|align=center|4
|align=center|28
|align=center|19
|align=center|3
|align=center|6
|align=center|84
|align=center|31
|align=center|60
|align=center|Round of 16
|align=left| Artiom Litviacov – 30
|align=left| Nicolae Mandrîcenco
|-
|align=center|2020–21
|align=center|9
|align=center|26
|align=center|9
|align=center|3
|align=center|14
|align=center|42
|align=center|61
|align=center|30
|align=center|2nd round
|align=left|
|align=left|
|}

Notes

Achievements
Divizia A
 Winners (1): 2004–05

Divizia B
 Winners (2): 2000–01, 2018

References

External links
FC Tighina on divizia-a.md 
FC Tighina on Soccerway

Football clubs in Moldova
Association football clubs established in 1950
FC Tighina
Football clubs in Transnistria
Football clubs in the Moldavian Soviet Socialist Republic